Michael Dreher (born 1974 in Ruit) is a German film director and screenwriter.

Life and work
Michael Dreher was born in Ruit, Ostfildern, Baden-Württemberg.

In 1996, he started to work as production manager and thereafter, in 1997, he studied film direction at the University of Television and Film Munich. Michael Dreher finished his study in 2006 with a successful diploma- and short film Fair Trade, which he produced together with Karim Debbagh and which was nominated for the Student Academy Award.

Filmography (selection)
2006: Fair Trade (Film director, Screenplay writer and Producer)
2009: Die zwei Leben des Daniel Shore (Film director and Screenplay writer)

Awards and nominations
Fair Trade (2006)
2006: AFI Fest - Audience award for Best Short
2006: German Short Film Award - Short Film Award in Gold
2007: Shnit international shortfilmfestival - Jury Award for Best LONG JOHN
2007: Aspen Shorts Fest - Jury Award for Best Drama
2007: Student Academy Awards - nomination for  Best Honorary Foreign Film

References

External links
 

1974 births
Living people
Film people from Baden-Württemberg
People from Esslingen (district)